Donnelly Township is the name of some places in the U.S. state of Minnesota:
Donnelly Township, Marshall County, Minnesota
Donnelly Township, Stevens County, Minnesota

Minnesota township disambiguation pages